Melanoplus indicifer, known generally as the spinecercus short-wing grasshopper or east coast scrub grasshopper, is a species of spur-throated grasshopper in the family Acrididae. It is found in North America.

References

Melanoplinae
Articles created by Qbugbot
Insects described in 1933